Julie Rutterford is a British film and television screenwriter.  She shared a BAFTA Award for Best Short Film with producer Janey de Nordwall and director Brian Percival in 2001 for their film About a Girl. She had previously scripted episodes for Brookside and some radio work.

She has also written episodes for three Kudos television drama series: Hustle, Life on Mars and Ashes to Ashes, as well as other popular series such as Teachers, and Shameless.

External links
 

Year of birth missing (living people)
Living people
British women screenwriters
British soap opera writers
British television writers
English television writers
British women television writers
English screenwriters
English soap opera writers
Women soap opera writers